Pârjol is a commune in Bacău County, Western Moldavia, Romania. It is composed of nine villages: Băhnășeni, Bărnești, Băsăști, Câmpeni, Hăineala, Hemieni (established in 2003), Pârjol, Pustiana and Tărâța. At the 2011 census, the commune's 5404 inhabitants were 94.2% Romanian and 3.53% Hungarian. At the 2002 census, they were 64.2% Romanian Orthodox, 35% Roman Catholic, and 0.8% Old Calendar Orthodox.

Pustiana

The village of Pustiana was first mentioned in 1792. It was established by Székely who fled from Transylvania after the Siculicidium. In 2002, it had 1961 people, broken down as follows: Romanians (78.99%), Hungarians (17.24%), Csangos (4.89%).

Notes

Communes in Bacău County
Localities in Western Moldavia